The Peruvian martin (Progne murphyi) is a species of bird in the family Hirundinidae. It is found in Peru and far northern Chile.

Its natural habitats are subtropical or tropical moist lowland forest, subtropical or tropical moist montane forest, subtropical or tropical dry lowland grassland, subtropical or tropical high-altitude grassland, pastureland, and urban areas. It is threatened by habitat loss.

References

External links
BirdLife Species Factsheet.

Peruvian martin
Birds of Peru
Peruvian martin
Taxonomy articles created by Polbot